Valerena-4,7(11)-diene synthase (EC 4.2.3.139, VoTPS2) is an enzyme with systematic name (2E,6E)-farnesyl-diphosphate diphosphate-lyase (cyclizing, valerena-4,7(11)-diene-forming). This enzyme catalyses the following chemical reaction

 (2E,6E)-farnesyl diphosphate  valerena-4,7(11)-diene + diphosphate

This enzyme is isolated from the plant Valeriana officinalis (valerian).

References

External links 
 

EC 4.2.3